Vichairachanon Khadpo (born March 3, 1968) is a Thai boxer. At the 1996 Summer Olympics he won a bronze medal in the men's bantamweight division, together with Raimkul Malakhbekov of Russia.

in Muay thai his name is Chingchai lookphraatit

1988 Olympic results
Below is the record of Vichairachanon Khadpo, a Thai flyweight boxer who competed at the 1988 Seoul Olympics:

 Round of 64: lost to Andy Agosto (Puerto Rico) by decision, 0-5

1996 Olympic results 
Below is the record of Vichairachanon Khadpo, a Thai bantamweight boxer who competed at the 1996 Atlanta Olympics:

Round of 32: Defeated Claude Lambert (Canada) 12-2
Round of 16: Defeated Carlos Barreto (Venezuela) 14-6
Quarterfinal: Defeated Hicham Nafil (Morocco) 13-4
Semifinal: Lost to István Kovács (Hungary) 7-12 (was awarded bronze medal)

References
 sports-reference

1968 births
Living people
Bantamweight boxers
Vichairachanon Khadpo
Boxers at the 1988 Summer Olympics
Boxers at the 1992 Summer Olympics
Boxers at the 1996 Summer Olympics
Vichairachanon Khadpo
Olympic medalists in boxing
Asian Games medalists in boxing
Vichairachanon Khadpo
Boxers at the 1994 Asian Games
Boxers at the 1990 Asian Games
Vichairachanon Khadpo
Medalists at the 1996 Summer Olympics
Vichairachanon Khadpo
Medalists at the 1990 Asian Games
Medalists at the 1994 Asian Games
Vichairachanon Khadpo
Southeast Asian Games medalists in boxing
Competitors at the 1991 Southeast Asian Games
Competitors at the 1995 Southeast Asian Games